Atelopus angelito, the Angelito stubfoot toad, is a species of toads in the family Bufonidae endemic to Colombia. Its natural habitats are subtropical or tropical moist montane forests, subtropical or tropical high-altitude shrubland, and rivers.

References

angelito
Amphibians of Colombia
Amphibians of the Andes
Amphibians described in 1998
Taxonomy articles created by Polbot